Bara Gewog is a former gewog (village block) of Samtse District, Bhutan. The gewog has an area of 186 square kilometres and contains 474 households. Bara Gewog comprises part of Sipsu Dungkhag (sub-district), together with Tendu, Biru, Lehereni, and Sipsu Gewog Gewogs.

References

Former gewogs of Bhutan
Samtse District